Alfonso Barracco (Crotone, 17 March 1810 – Naples, 15 January 1890) was an Italian politician. He served in the Chamber of Deputies of the Kingdom of Sardinia.

References

External links
 

1810 births
1890 deaths
19th-century Italian politicians
Members of the Senate of the Kingdom of Sardinia